SK Planet Co., Ltd. (Hangul: SK 플래닛 or 에스케이 플래닛), a subsidiary of SK Telecom, was established in 2011 and is an internet platform development company located in Pangyo, South Korea’s silicon valley with operations in 8 countries. SK Planet was spun off from SK Telecom to focus on online services and has since evolved to focus on three core business services: e-Commerce, Online-to-Offline services, and digital marketing.

Products and Business Services 
Since its inception, SK Planet has owned, operated, and developed a variety of digital products and services ranging from business, entertainment, financial technology, social media platforms, mobile messaging, LBS services, mobile commerce, and marketing.

E-Commerce 
SK Planet owns and operates 11st.co.kr – an e-Commerce shopping website in South Korea, where online buyers can purchase goods and services from sellers through its online marketplace platform. As of 2016, 11st.co.kr became South Korea’s most visited e-Commerce site and is number one in mobile commerce with the highest monthly unique visitors among mobile shopping apps in Korea. SK Planet then became a global e-Commerce company by expanding 11st.co.kr into new international markets with its first global venture in 2013 with N11.com in Turkey, followed by subsequent yearly expansions with Elevenia in Indonesia in 2014, 11street Malaysia in 2015, and 11street Thailand in 2017.

Online-to-Offline Services 
OK Cashbag is South Korea’s most widely used integrated loyalty program where customers can earn points across a variety of retailers and redeem those points for goods, services, and discounts with over 60,000 merchants, and 38 million subscribers on its marketing platform.

Syrup is a singular brand of multiple consumer mobile apps in South Korea specializing in online-to-offline services including:
 Gifticon, initially launched in 2006 as Korea’s first mobile voucher service, where users can purchase digital vouchers and send them as gifts, which can then be redeemed at the point of sale.
 Syrup Wallet, a mobile wallet service using BLE and geo-fencing technology to provide the user with membership promotions and discounts from over 400 brands, and also serves as a digital wallet for membership cards.
 Syrup Table, a mobile app focusing on food and beverage establishments to provide crowd-sourced reviews about local restaurants, nearby promotions and discounts, as well as pre-ordering services.
 Syrup Style, a curated fashion app where users can browse through apparel, shoes, bags, and accessories, purchase them directly, then have them delivered or picked up at the offline store.
 Syrup Pay, a web based payment solution where users initially register their payment preference, such as credit card, bank transfer, or mobile carrier billing to pay for their purchases then enter a passcode to transact.

Digital Marketing and Advertising

International Markets

United States 
SK Planet Inc. is the operational entity located in San Francisco, California. In 2014, SK Planet acquired Shopkick Inc. for $200 million, a mobile shopping companion that informs and rewards customers with points for walking into participating stores which can be redeemed for discounts.

China 
SK Planet launched an e-Commerce website offering products from Korea, as well as their O2O service Syrup Style in China.

Japan 
SK Planet owns and operates Cotoco under SK Planet Japan, a mobile gifting application where users can purchase and send gift vouchers from participating vendors and retailers.

Turkey 
SK Planet deployed its first e-Commerce venture, n11.com, in Turkey in 2013 through a joint-venture with Doğuş Group under Doğuş Planet. It has since grown to become the top e-Commerce marketplace in Turkey within three years of operations beating out its rivals Gittigidiyor and Hepsiburada.

Indonesia 
SK Planet established elevenia, an e-Commerce marketplace in Indonesia through a joint-venture with XL-Axiata in 2014. Elevenia is owned and operated under XL Planet, and is the first e-Commerce venture in South East Asia for SK Planet. Both joint-venture partners have recently placed a Series-B investment of $50 million USD, to further support the growing e-Commerce venture.

Malaysia 
11street Malaysia is an e-Commerce marketplace owned and operated by Celcom Planet, which was launched in 2015 as a joint-venture between Celcom Axiata and SK Planet. Leveraging the growing Hallyu Korean wave reception in South East Asia, rising Korean actor Lee Min-Ho became a brand ambassador for 11street Malaysia during its launch campaign.

Thailand 
SK Planet launched its fifth e-Commerce venture in Thailand as a wholly owned subsidiary, known as 11street Thailand. The official launch included a large marketing campaign, with the Korean Actor Song Joong-Ki and rising Thai actress Mew Nittha as brand ambassadors.

References 

Companies of South Korea
Telecom